St James’s House is a Grade II listed office building in Birmingham, England.

The 1950s building was designed for the Engineering and Allied Employer’s Federation by the local architect, John Madin, and built from 1955–1957. It is located at 16 Frederick Road, at its junction with St James Road (note spelling), in the Edgbaston district of the city.

It is one, of the fourteen finest post-war offices designed by leading architects" listed by Historic England in January 2015. They noted the "bold, modern exterior" and an interior designed to "forge constructive relations between employers and their workforce".

References

External links 

 

Grade II listed buildings in Birmingham
John Madin
Office buildings in Birmingham, West Midlands
Edgbaston
Buildings and structures completed in 1957
20th-century architecture in the United Kingdom